Carl Gustaf Bergsten (10 May 1879 in Norrköping - 22 April 1935 in Stockholm) was a Swedish architect.  He graduated in 1901 from the KTH Royal Institute of Technology and  three years later from the  Royal Swedish Academy of Fine Arts in Stockholm. A scholarship took him to Germany and to Vienna.  He  apprenticed  with architects Isak Gustaf Clason and  Erik Lallerstedt.
Bergsten ran his own architectural firm from 1904-35.
He was influenced by the National Romantic style and Functionalism. He designed a number of exhibition spaces including Liljevalchs konsthall. For the Norrköping Exhibition of Art and Industry in 1906,   Bergsten designed the exhibition's two main buildings the   Industrial Hall  (Industrihallen) and  the Art Exhibition Hall (Konsthallen) as well as  the Hunting Pavilion (Jaktpaviljongen).

Selected works
 Norrköping Exhibition of Art and Industry (1906)
 Liljevalchs konsthall (1916)
  Swedish Pavilion  International Exhibition of Modern Decorative and Industrial Arts in Paris (1925) 
 Metropolitan Museum of Art, Exhibition of Swedish Contemporary Decorative Arts, installation design (1927)
 Gothenburg City Theatre (1934)

References

Swedish architects
1879 births
1935 deaths
People from Norrköping
KTH Royal Institute of Technology alumni